Mina Libeer (born 29 December 1997) is a Belgian judoka.

She is the bronze medallist of the 2021 Judo Grand Slam Paris in the -57 kg category.

References

External links
 

1998 births
Living people
Belgian female judoka
European Games competitors for Belgium
Judoka at the 2019 European Games
20th-century Belgian women
21st-century Belgian women